The 2001 Norwich Union League season was a 45 over English county cricket competition; colloquially known as the Sunday League, it featured many mid-week floodlit matches. It was contested through two divisions: Division One and Division Two. Each team played all the others in their division both home and away. The top three teams from Division Two were promoted to the first division for the 2002 season, while the bottom three sides from Division One were relegated. All eighteen counties retained the nicknames from the previous season.

Kent Spitfires won the League for the fifth time. Gloucestershire Gladiators, Surrey Lions and Northamptonshire Steelbacks were relegated from Division One, while Glamorgan Dragons, Durham Dynamos and Worcestershire Royals were promoted from Division Two.

Teams

Standings
 Pos = Position, Pld = Played, W = Wins, T = Ties, L = Losses, NR = No Results, A = Abandonments, Pts = Points.
 Points awarded: W = 4, L = 0, T = 2, NR = 2, A = 2

Division One

Division Two

Statistics

Division One

Most runs

Most wickets

Division Two

Most runs

Most wickets

References

Norwich Union
Pro40